Out There is Eleanor McEvoy's sixth studio album. McEvoy, a multi-instrumentalist, produced and arranged Out There, and played all instruments on the album and supplied all vocals. The album includes ten new compositions by McEvoy plus two co-writes with the Beautiful South's Dave Rotheray.  On track 5, Vigeland's Dream, McEvoy eloquently describes a walk she once took in Vigeland Sculpture Park which is a part of Frogner Park (Frognerparken), a public park located in the borough of Frogner, in Oslo, Norway. The album also includes an updated version of Marvin Gaye's classic "Mercy Mercy Me (The Ecology)" as well as a new version of Lowell George's "Roll Um Easy."

Critical reception

Out There received a good review and a four and a half star rating from Pete Whalley and Jason Ritchie of the website Get Ready to ROCK! The album was awarded "Record of the Year" from Hi-Fi+ Magazine in 2007.

Track listings

Singles
 "Non Smoking Single Female"
 "Suffer So Well"
 "Wrong So Wrong" (disc contains bonus video of Wrong So Wrong)

Formats
Out There  was released in Hybrid Stereo SACD format, and on vinyl in 2007 by Diverse Vinyl (DIV 010LP).

References

External links
Eleanor McEvoy official website

2006 albums
Eleanor McEvoy albums